San Mateo County, officially the County of San Mateo, is a county located in  the U.S. state of California. As of the 2020 census, the population was 764,442. Redwood City is the county seat, and the third most populated city following Daly City and San Mateo.  San Mateo County is included in the San Francisco-Oakland-Berkeley, CA MSA (metropolitan statistical area), Silicon Valley, and is part of the San Francisco Bay Area, the nine counties bordering San Francisco Bay. It covers most of the San Francisco Peninsula.  San Francisco International Airport is located in the northeastern area of the county and is approximately 7 miles south of the city and county limits of San Francisco, even though the airport itself is assigned a San Francisco postal address.  The county's built-up areas are mostly suburban, and are home to several corporate campuses.

History
San Mateo County was formed in 1856 upon the division of San Francisco County, one of the state's 18 original counties established at California statehood in 1850.  Until 1856, San Francisco's city limits extended west to Divisadero Street and Castro Street, and south to 20th Street. In 1856, the California state government divided the county. A straight line was then drawn across the tip of the San Francisco Peninsula just north of San Bruno Mountain. Everything south of the line became the new San Mateo County while everything north of the line became the new consolidated City and County of San Francisco.
San Mateo County was officially organized on April 18, 1857 under a bill introduced by Senator T.G. Phelps. The 1857 bill defined the southern boundary of San Mateo County as following the south branch of San Francisquito Creek to its source in the Santa Cruz Mountains and thence due west to the Pacific Ocean, and named Redwood City as the county seat. San Mateo County then annexed part of northern Santa Cruz County in March 1868, including Pescadero and Pigeon Point.

Although the formation bill named Redwood City the county seat, a May 1856 election marked by "unblushing frauds perpetuated on an unorganized and wholly unprotected community by thugs and ballot stuffers from San Francisco" named Belmont the county seat. The election results were declared illegal and the county government was moved to Redwood City, with land being donated from the original Pulgas Grant for the county government on February 27, 1858. Redwood City's status as county seat was upheld in two successive elections in May 1861 and December 9, 1873, defeating San Mateo and Belmont. Another election in May 1874 named San Mateo the county seat, but the state supreme court overturned that election on February 24, 1875, and the county seat has remained at Redwood City ever since.

San Mateo County bears the Spanish name for Saint Matthew. As a place name, San Mateo appears as early as 1776 in the diaries of Anza and Font. Several local geographic features were also designated San Mateo on early maps including variously: a settlement, an arroyo,  a headland jutting into the Pacific (Point Montara), and a large land holding (Rancho San Mateo). Until about 1850, the name appeared as San Matheo.

Japanese Americans in San Mateo 
The Japanese first arrived in San Mateo County and were part of a group guided by Ambassador Tomomi Iwakura in 1872. A number of male Japanese students came to San Mateo to learn English and many other helpful skills to bring back to Japan. These students were also some of the first Japanese to join American students in the Belmont School for Boys. These students had to work for their housing and food before classes and in the evenings. Many of the first Japanese immigrants were able to find jobs as gardeners and landscapers in San Mateo. Most of them had a good educational background from their homelands, but their lack of knowledge of the English language made it difficult for them to find other jobs in the beginning.

Geography
It is the third-smallest county in California by land area. A number of bayside watercourses drain the eastern part of the county including San Bruno Creek and Colma Creek. Streams draining the western county include Frenchmans Creek, Pilarcitos Creek, Naples Creek, Arroyo de en Medio, and Denniston Creek. These streams originate along the northern spur of the Santa Cruz Mountains that run through the county. The northern and eastern parts of the county are very heavy densely populated with largely urban and suburban areas, with many of its cities as edge-cities for the Bay Area, while the deep south and the west-central parts of the county are less densely populated with more rural environment and coastal beaches areas.

Features
San Mateo County straddles the San Francisco Peninsula, with the Santa Cruz Mountains running its entire length. The county encompasses a variety of habitats, including estuarine, marine, oak woodland, redwood forest, coastal scrub and oak savannah. There are numerous species of wildlife present, especially along the San Francisco Bay estuarine shoreline, San Bruno Mountain, Fitzgerald Marine Reserve and the forests on the Montara Mountain block. Several creeks discharge to the San Francisco Bay, including San Mateo Creek and Laurel Creek, and several coastal streams discharge to the Pacific Ocean, such as Frenchmans Creek and San Vicente Creek.

Año Nuevo State Marine Conservation Area and Greyhound Rock State Marine Conservation Area are two adjoining marine protected areas off the coast of San Mateo County. Like underwater parks, these marine protected areas help conserve ocean wildlife and marine ecosystems.

Flora and fauna
The county is home to several endangered species including the San Francisco garter snake and the San Bruno elfin butterfly, both of which are endemic to San Mateo County. The endangered Ridgway's Rail is also found on the shores of San Francisco Bay, in the cities of Belmont and San Mateo. The endangered wildflower Hickman's potentilla is found near the Pacific Ocean on the lower slopes of Montara Mountain. The endangered wildflowers White-rayed pentachaeta, Pentachaeta bellidiflora, San Mateo Woolly Sunflower, Eriophyllum latilobum, Marin Dwarf Flax, Hesperolinon congestum and the San Mateo Thornmint, Acanthomintha duttonii, are found in the vicinity of the Crystal Springs Reservoir.

In May 2014, a California condor was spotted near Pescadero, a coastal community south of San Francisco—it was the first California condor spotted in San Mateo County since 1904. The condor, tagged with the number "597", and also known as "Lupine", is one of 439 condors living in the wild or captivity in California, Baja California and Arizona.

Pumas (Puma concolor), also known as cougars or mountain lions, roam the county.

Tule elk (Cervus canadensis nannodes) were native to San Mateo County and among the "favored foods" of the Ohlone people based on ethnohistoric and archeological evidence there. The discovery of two elk specimens made news in 1962, one a royal elk (royal elk bulls have six tines per antler) from a peat bog excavated in Pacifica's historic Laguna Alta, and now in the Museum of Vertebrate Zoology collection. These may date from the time of Spanish settlement. Laguna Alta lay just south of the Interstate 280 and Skyline Boulevard intersection, east of Mussel Rock. The California Academy of Sciences also has an elk skull fragment collected one mile inland from the mouth of Purisima Creek in 1951. Additional coastal elk remains dating from the Middle and Late Periods in Northern California were found in at least five more late Holocene archeological sites in San Mateo County: SMA-115 (Montara State Beach site), SMA-118 (Bean Hollow State Beach site), SMA-244 (Butano Ridge site), SMA-97 (Año Nuevo Creek site) and SMA-218 (Año Nuevo State Reserve site). On the eastern side of the San Francisco Peninsula, elk remains were also unearthed at multiple archaeological sites along San Francisquito Creek.

National protected areas
 Don Edwards San Francisco Bay National Wildlife Refuge (part)
 Golden Gate National Recreation Area (part)

Marine protected area
 Montara State Marine Reserve & Pillar Point State Marine Conservation Area

County parks

The County of San Mateo Parks Department operates 22 parks, trails, and historic sites spread throughout the county:

Notes

Prior to the rebuilding of the San Mateo Bridge that began in 1996, the county had also operated Werder Pier for fishermen; it had been the western segment of the original 1929 vertical-lift bridge.

In addition to the county-operated parks, San Mateo County voters created the Midpeninsula Regional Open Space District in 1972, administered by the Peninsula Open Space Trust, which owns several protected spaces within San Mateo County (as well as within Santa Clara and Santa Cruz counties). San Mateo County protected spaces administered by POST include:

 Coal Creek Open Space Preserve
 El Corte de Madera Creek
 La Honda Creek Open Space Preserve
 Long Ridge Open Space Preserve (partially within Santa Clara County)
 Los Trancos Open Space Preserve (partially within Santa Clara County)
 Pulgas Ridge Open Space Preserve
 Purisima Creek Redwoods Open Space Preserve
 Ravenswood Open Space Preserve
 Russian Ridge Open Space Preserve
 Skyline Ridge Open Space Preserve
 Teague Hill Open Space Preserve
 Thornewood Open Space Preserve
 Windy Hill Open Space Preserve

State parks

 Año Nuevo State Park
 Butano State Park
 Castle Rock State Park
 Heritage Grove
 Portola Redwoods State Park
 Quarry Park
 Burleigh H. Murray Ranch
 Pigeon Point Light Station Historic State Park
 Point Montara Light Station State Park
 San Bruno Mountain State Park

State beaches

 Año Nuevo State Reserve
 Bean Hollow State Beach
 Big Basin State Beach
 Gray Whale Cove State Beach
 Half Moon Bay State Beach
 Montara State Beach
 Pacifica State Beach
 Pebble Beach
 Pescadero State Beach
 Pomponio State Beach
 San Gregorio State Beach
 Thornton State Beach

Demographics

2020 census

Note: the US Census treats Hispanic/Latino as an ethnic category. This table excludes Latinos from the racial categories and assigns them to a separate category. Hispanics/Latinos can be of any race.

2012
As of 2012, San Mateo County had one of the largest Tongan communities outside of Tonga, with an estimated 13,000 Tongan Americans.

2011

Places by population, race, and income

2010
The 2010 United States Census reported that San Mateo County had a population of 718,451. The racial makeup of San Mateo County was 383,535 (53.4%) White, 20,436 (2.8%) African American, 3,306 (0.5%) Native American, 178,118 (24.8%) Asian (9.8% Filipino, 9.0% Chinese, 1.9% Indian, 1.2% Japanese, 0.8% Korean, 0.5% Vietnamese, 0.3% Burmese, 0.1% Pakistani), 10,317 (1.4%) Pacific Islander (0.6% Tongan, 0.3% Samoan, 0.2% Fijian, 0.1% Native Hawaiian), 84,529 (11.8%) from other races, and 38,210 (5.3%) from two or more races. Hispanic or Latino of any race were 182,502 persons (25.4%); 15.7% of San Mateo County is Mexican, 2.7% Salvadoran, 1.2% Guatemalan, 1.2% Nicaraguan, 0.7% Peruvian, 0.6% Puerto Rican, 0.2% Colombian, and 0.2% Cuban.

2000

As of the census of 2009, there were 714,936 people, 258,648 households, and 174,582 families residing in the county. The population density was 2,753/sq mi (825/km2).

There were 258,648 households, out of which 30% had children under the age of 18, 48.6% were married couples living together, 14.7% had a female householder with no husband present, and 41.7% were non-families. 31.5% of all households were made up of individuals, and 6.2% had someone living alone who was 65 years of age or older. The average household size was 3.79 and the average family size was 4.44.

In the county, the population was spread out, with 28.6% under the age of 18, 15.9% from 18 to 24, 25.8% from 25 to 44, 21% from 45 to 64, and 9.7% who were 65 years of age or older. The median age was 31 years. For every 100 females there were 97.8 males. For every 100 females age 18 and over, there were 95.1 males.

The median income for a household in the county was $69,306, and the median income for a family was $77,737. Males had a median income of $48,342 versus $45,383 for females. The per capita income for the county was $36,045. About 6.42% of families and 9.51% of the population were below the poverty line, including 10.01% of those under age 18 and 8.52% of those age 65 or over.

Government 
San Mateo County has a five-member Board of Supervisors, representing five geographic districts, elected at-large until November 2012. On November 6, 2012, Measure B passed to amend the San Mateo County Charter so that each member of the Board of Supervisors will cease to be elected by an at-large vote of all the voters in the County, but is instead elected only by the voters of his or her district.
 District 1 is represented by Dave Pine.
 District 2 is represented by Noelia Corzo.
 District 3 is represented by Ray Mueller.
 District 4 is represented by Warren Slocum.
 District 5 is represented by David Canepa.

In the California State Assembly, San Mateo County is split between three legislative districts:
 ,
 , and
 .

Politics

Presidential election results and voter registration

Cities by population and voter registration

Overview 
The California Secretary of State, as of February 2019, reports that San Mateo County has 404,958 registered voters. Of those voters, 202,341 (50%) are registered Democratic, 60,045 (14.3%) are registered Republican, 15,834 (3.9%) are registered with other political parties, and 126,738 (31.3%) declined to state a political party preference. Every city, town, and unincorporated area of San Mateo County has more registered Democrats than Republicans.

On November 4, 2008, San Mateo County voted 61.8% against Proposition 8, which amended the California Constitution to ban same-sex marriages.

Crime 

The following table includes the number of incidents reported and the rate per 1,000 persons for each type of offense.

Cities by population and crime rates

Economy
A July 2013 Wall Street Journal article identified the Facebook initial public offering (IPO) as the cause of a change in the U.S.' national economic statistics, as San Mateo County—the home of the company—became the top wage-earning county in the country after the fourth quarter of 2012. The article revealed that the Bureau of Labor Statistics reported that the average weekly wage in the county was $3,240, which is 107% higher than the previous year: "That’s the equivalent of $168,000 a year, and more than 50% higher than the next highest county, New York County (better known as Manhattan), which came in at $2,107 a week, or roughly $110,000 a year."

As of the fourth quarter of 2021, the median value of homes in San Mateo County was $1,247,070, an increase of 11% from the prior year. It ranked fourth in the US for counties with highest median home value, behind Nantucket, Manhattan, and Santa Clara.

Additionally, San Mateo County hosts the headquarters of Visa Inc, Sony Interactive Entertainment, Electronic Arts, YouTube, Genentech, GoPro, and Gilead Sciences, as well as a hub of venture capital firms in Menlo Park and several other technology-related companies.

In 2016, Peninsula Clean Energy began providing electricity to 20 percent of residential customers, all municipalities, and all small- to mid-size businesses in the county, as a Community Choice Aggregation program, an alternative to Pacific Gas and Electric.

Education
The people of San Mateo County may use the services of San Mateo County Libraries along with the Peninsula Library System and its dozens of branches, bookmobile and Library-a-Go-Go machine at the Millbrae BART/Caltrain station.

The county is divided into several public school districts and is also served by the local Catholic diocese and many other private parochial and secular schools. The San Mateo County Board of Education oversees early education, special education, and the court and community schools program in the county, as well as serves as an appeal board for the adjudication of expulsion appeals, interdistrict attendance appeals, and charter schools.

Some students in San Mateo County's public schools attend outdoor education in La Honda. San Mateo Outdoor Education is a residential school that teaches major concepts of ecology via exploration of forest, pond, garden, tidepool, wetland, and sandy shore habitats. The center's mascot is the banana slug, a large yellow gastropod. The school uses songs from the famous Banana Slug String Band.

K-12 school districts
They include:

 Unified
 Cabrillo Unified School District
 La Honda-Pescadero Unified School District
 South San Francisco Unified School District

 Secondary
 Jefferson Union High School District
 San Mateo Union High School District
 Sequoia Union High School District

 Elementary

 Bayshore Elementary School District
 Belmont-Redwood Shores Elementary School District
 Brisbane Elementary School District
 Burlingame Elementary School District
 Hillsborough City Elementary School District
 Jefferson Elementary School District
 Las Lomitas Elementary School District
 Menlo Park City Elementary School District
 Millbrae Elementary School District
 Pacifica School District
 Portola Valley Elementary School District
 Ravenswood City Elementary School District
 Redwood City Elementary School District
 San Bruno Park Elementary School District
 San Carlos Elementary School District
 San Mateo-Foster City Elementary School District
 Woodside Elementary School District

Transportation

Major highways

 Interstate 280
 Interstate 380
 U.S. Route 101
 State Route 1
 State Route 9
 State Route 35
 State Route 82 (El Camino Real)
 State Route 84 (Dumbarton Bridge)
 State Route 92 (San Mateo Bridge)
 State Route 109
 State Route 114

Public transportation
SamTrans (San Mateo County Transit District) provides local bus service within San Mateo County. Local and commuter bus routes also operate into San Francisco.

Caltrain, the commuter rail system, traverses the county from north to south, running alongside the Highway 101 corridor for most of the way.

Bay Area Rapid Transit (BART) trains serve San Francisco International Airport and the northern portion of the county, terminating at Millbrae.

Caltrain, BART, and SamTrans converge at the Millbrae Intermodal station.

Airports
San Francisco International Airport is geographically located in San Mateo County, but it is owned and operated by the City and County of San Francisco.

San Mateo County does own two general aviation airports: Half Moon Bay Airport and San Carlos Airport.

Marine transport
The only deepwater port in South San Francisco Bay is the Port of Redwood City, situated along Redwood Creek, originally created as a lumber embarcadero in 1850. The San Mateo Harbor Harbor District manages the Pillar Point Harbor and Oyster Point Marina. Ferry connections connect Oyster Point to Jack London Square in Oakland and the Alameda Ferry Terminal in Alameda.

Notable structures

There are a number of well-known structures within San Mateo County:

 Carolands Mansion, Hillsborough
 Cow Palace, Daly City
 Uplands Mansion, Hillsborough
 Crystal Springs Reservoir, unincorporated central part of county
 CuriOdyssey, San Mateo
 Filoli Mansion, Woodside
 The Flintstone House, Hillsborough
 Notre Dame de Namur University, Belmont, which incorporates Ralston Hall
 Pigeon Point Lighthouse, Pescadero
 Point Montara Lighthouse, Montara
 Pulgas Water Temple, Woodside
 Sanchez Adobe, Pacifica
 San Mateo County History Museum, Redwood City
 San Francisco International Airport
 Stanford Linear Accelerator Center, Menlo Park

Communities

Cities

Belmont
Brisbane
Burlingame
Daly City
East Palo Alto
Foster City
Half Moon Bay
Menlo Park
Millbrae
Pacifica
Redwood City (county seat)
San Bruno
San Carlos
San Mateo
South San Francisco

Towns
Atherton
Colma
Hillsborough
Portola Valley
Woodside

Census-designated places

Broadmoor
El Granada
Emerald Lake Hills
Highlands-Baywood Park
Ladera
La Honda
Loma Mar
Montara
Moss Beach
North Fair Oaks
Pescadero
West Menlo Park

Unincorporated communities

Burlingame Hills
Devonshire
Kings Mountain
Los Trancos Woods
Menlo Oaks
Palomar Park
Princeton-by-the-Sea
San Gregorio
Sky Londa

Population ranking

The population ranking of the following table is based on the 2020 census of San Mateo County.

† county seat

See also

List of school districts in San Mateo County, California
List of California Historical Landmarks in San Mateo County, California
National Register of Historic Places listings in San Mateo County, California
Peninsula Humane Society
Seaport Centre
Telephone Area code 650
Leo J. Ryan Memorial Park
Leo J. Ryan Federal Building
Silicon Valley
 Thomas Bones (1842–1929), lumberman in this area
 Second Harvest of Silicon Valley

Notes

References

External links

Visitors Guide from the Visitors Bureau
San Mateo County Library – 12 branches throughout the County and a bookmobile
Peninsula Library System – serving all of San Mateo County
Superior Court Records
SamCERA (San Mateo County Employees' Retirement Association)
Brisbane Baylands Project
Diseño del Rancho Cañada de Guadalupe, la Visitacion y Rodeo Viejo : San Mateo Co., Ca at the Bancroft Library

 

 
California counties
Counties in the San Francisco Bay Area
1856 establishments in California
Populated places established in 1856
Majority-minority counties in California